Houston station may refer to:

Houston station (British Columbia), a Canadian National Railway station in Houston, British Columbia
Houston station (Texas), an Amtrak station in Houston, Texas
Houston railway station (Scotland), a station in Houston, Renfrewshire, Scotland
Georgetown railway station (Scotland), originally Houston, a former railway station Houston, Renfrewshire, Scotland

New York City Subway:
Houston Street (IND Second Avenue Line)
Houston Street (IRT Broadway – Seventh Avenue Line)
Houston Street (IRT Ninth Avenue Line)
Houston Street (IRT Third Avenue Line)

See also
Houston (disambiguation)
Houston Street (disambiguation)
Heuston railway station, in Dublin, Ireland
Union Station (Houston), a Union Station in Houston, Texas